Ismaël Wandepanga Ouedraogo (born 10 March 1991) is a Burkinabé professional footballer who plays as a midfielder. He played for Czech clubs Dukla Prague and Baník Sokolov. Ouedraogo joined Dukla in 2012 from US Ouagadougou, a club in the capital city of his country. Ouedraogo  was called up to the Burkina Faso national football team in May 2014. He joined Baník Sokolov on loan during the summer of 2014.

References

External links
 

1991 births
Living people
Association football midfielders
Burkinabé footballers
Burkinabé expatriate footballers
Czech First League players
FK Dukla Prague players
FK Baník Sokolov players
Expatriate footballers in the Czech Republic
Burkinabé expatriate sportspeople in the Czech Republic
US Ouagadougou players
21st-century Burkinabé people